Surkov is a Russian masculine surname, its feminine counterpart is Surkova. It may refer to

Alexey Surkov (1899–1983), Russian poet
Artem Surkov (born 1993), Russian wrestler
Mikhail Surkov (1921–1953), Soviet sniper during World War II
Nikita Surkov (born 1987), Russian football player
Vladislav Surkov (born 1964), Russian businessman and political strategist

See also
5455 Surkov (1978 RV5), a main-belt asteroid

Russian-language surnames